Meningoencephalitis (from ; ; and the medical suffix -itis, "inflammation"), also known as herpes meningoencephalitis, is a medical condition that simultaneously resembles both meningitis, which is an infection or inflammation of the meninges, and encephalitis, which is an infection or inflammation of the brain.

Signs and symptoms
Signs of meningoencephalitis include unusual behavior, personality changes, nausea and thinking problems.

Symptoms may include headache, fever, pain in neck movement, light sensitivity, and seizure.

Causes
Causative organisms include protozoans, viral and bacterial pathogens.

Specific types include:

Bacterial
Veterinarians have observed meningoencephalitis in animals infected with listeriosis, caused by the pathogenic bacteria L. monocytogenes. Meningitis and encephalitis already present in the brain or spinal cord of an animal may form simultaneously into meningeoencephalitis. The bacterium commonly targets the sensitive structures of the brain stem. L. monocytogenes meningoencephalitis has been documented to significantly increase the number of cytokines, such as IL-1β, IL-12, IL-15, leading to toxic effects on the brain.

Meningoencephalitis may be one of the severe complications of diseases originating from several Rickettsia species, such as Rickettsia rickettsii (agent of Rocky Mountain spotted fever (RMSF)), Rickettsia conorii, Rickettsia prowazekii (agent of epidemic louse-borne typhus), and Rickettsia africae. It can cause impairments to the cranial nerves, paralysis to the eyes, and sudden hearing loss. Meningoencephalitis is a rare, late-stage manifestation of tick-borne ricksettial diseases, such as RMSF and human monocytotropic ehrlichiosis (HME), caused by Ehrlichia chaffeensis (a species of rickettsiales bacteria).

Other bacteria that can cause it are Mycoplasma pneumoniae, Tuberculosis, Borrelia (Lyme disease) and Leptospirosis.

Viral
 Tick-borne encephalitis
 West Nile virus
 Measles
 Epstein–Barr virus
 Varicella-zoster virus
 Enterovirus
 Herpes simplex virus type 1
 Herpes simplex virus type 2
 Rabies virus
 Adenovirus, although meningoencephalitis is almost solely seen in heavily immunocompromised patients.
 Mumps, a relatively common cause of meningoencephalitis.  However, most cases are mild, and mumps meningoencephalitis generally does not result in death or neurologic sequelae.
 HIV, a very small number of individuals exhibit meningoencephalitis at the primary stage of infection.

Autoimmune
 Antibodies targeting amyloid beta peptide proteins which have been used during research on Alzheimer's disease.
 Anti-N-methyl-D-aspartate (anti-NMDA) receptor antibodies, which are also associated with seizures and a movement disorder, and related to anti-NMDA receptor encephalitis.
 NAIM or "Nonvasculitic autoimmune inflammatory meningoencephalitis" (NAIM). They can be divided into GFAP- and GFAP+ cases. The second is related to the autoimmune GFAP astrocytopathy.

Protozoal
 Naegleria fowleri (percolozoa)
 Trypanosoma brucei (euglenozoa)
 Toxoplasma gondii (apicomplexa)

Animal
 Halicephalobus gingivalis
This nematode is an exceptionally rare cause of meningoencephalitis.

Other/multiple
Other causes include granulomatous meningoencephalitis and vasculitis. The fungus, Cryptococcus neoformans, can be symptomatically manifested within the CNS as meningoencephalitis with hydrocephalus being a very characteristic finding due to the unique thick polysaccharide capsule of the organism.

Diagnosis
Clinical diagnosis includes evaluation for the presence of recurrent or recent herpes infection, fever, headache, altered mental status, convulsions, disturbance of consciousness, and focal signs. Testing of cerebrospinal fluid is usually performed.

Treatment

Antiviral therapy, such as acyclovir and ganciclovir, work best when applied as early as possible.  May also be treated with interferon as an immune therapy. Symptomatic therapy can be applied as needed. High fever can be treated by physical regulation of body temperature. Seizure can be treated with antiepileptic drugs. High intracranial pressure can be treated with drugs such as mannitol. If caused by an infection then the infection can be treated with antibiotic drugs.

See also
 Meningitis
 Meningism
 Primary amoebic meningoencephalitis
 Encephalitis
 Naegleria fowleri

References

External links 

Encephalitis
Meningitis
Central nervous system disorders
Herpes simplex virus–associated diseases